Haentjens may refer to:

 Alphonse-Alfred Haentjens (1824–1884), French industrialist and politician
 Brigitte Haentjens, Canadian theatre director 
 Charles Haentjens (1821–1874), Haitian diplomat and politician
 Clément Haentjens (1847–1923), Haitian diplomat and politician
 Marcel Haëntjens (1869–1915), French croquet player